František Flos (27 July 1864, Přelouč – 8 January 1961, Prague) was a Czech writer. His novel, Lovci orchidejí, was published in 1920.

Czech novelists
Male novelists
Czech male writers
1894 births
1961 deaths
People from Přelouč
20th-century novelists
20th-century male writers